Rahva Hääl (lit. The People's Voice) was the official daily newspaper of the Communist Party of Estonia during Soviet occupation of Estonia. It was founded shortly after the first Soviet takeover in 1940 based on offices and resources of Uus Eesti (New Estonia), an earlier Estonian newspaper.

The last issue of Uue Eesti was published on June 21, 1940. The first issue of Rahva Hääle was put together by the old editors under the leadership of new editors, and the paper was published on June 22, 1940.

See also
Eastern Bloc media and propaganda

References

1940 establishments in Estonia
1995 disestablishments in Estonia
Defunct newspapers published in Estonia
Newspapers published in the Soviet Union
Communism in Estonia
Communist newspapers
Eastern Bloc mass media
Estonian-language newspapers
Mass media in Tallinn
Newspapers established in 1940
Publications disestablished in 1995